Visions is the sixth studio album by power metal band Stratovarius, released on 28 April 1997 through Noise Records. The album reached No. 4 on the Finnish albums chart and remained on that chart for 23 weeks. It is a concept album about Nostradamus.

Critical reception

Steve Huey at AllMusic gave Visions four stars out of five, calling it "as ambitious as neoclassical metal gets" and saying "there are some fine moments on the record", but also remarking that "too much of the material sinks under its own weight, particularly the ten-minute title track."

In 2005, the album was ranked No. 297 in Rock Hard magazine's book of The 500 Greatest Rock & Metal Albums of All Time.

Loudwire named the album at sixth in their list "Top 25 Power Metal Albums of All Time." Metal Hammer also named the album in their list "The 10 essential power metal albums."

Track listing

Personnel
Timo Kotipelto – lead vocals
Timo Tolkki – guitar, background vocals, mastering, production
Jens Johansson – keyboards, harpsichord
Jörg Michael – drums
Jari Kainulainen – bass guitar
Kimmo Blom – background vocals
Marko Vaara – background vocals
Richard Johnson – background vocals, lyrical consultation
James M. Johnson – spoken vocals
Mikko Karmila – engineering, mixing
Pauli Saastamoinen – mastering

Chart performance

References

Stratovarius albums
1997 albums
Noise Records albums
Cultural depictions of Nostradamus